Rahima Begum (born 22 May 1984) is an English human rights activist who is the co-founder of international human rights organisation Restless Beings, and an artist and researcher.

Early life
Begum attended Plashet School until 2000 and then attended Seven Kings High School. She graduated with an MA in postcolonial history, literature and theory from University College London.

Career
Begum worked as a researcher, illustrator and freelance artist. In October 2007, she co-founded Restless Beings with academic consultant Mabrur Uddin Ahmed (born 1983). Restless Beings is an international grassroots human rights organisation and registered UK charity that supports marginalised communities across the world. The organisation occupies the space between activism, advocacy and academia.

Begum has been outspoken and passionate about human rights from a young age. She has worked across the community from co-hosting and speaking at women's rights events, championing arts and human rights across the British Bangladeshi community, alongside work with media. She has mobilised civil society and spearheaded several national and international campaigns. In addition to this, Begum has consulted various think tanks, NGO/INGOs on how to better serve vulnerable communities as well as offered her assistance on policy shifting research projects. She is a panel expert, and has lectured on human rights both domestically and internationally (Berkeley California, LSE, University of Columbia, NYU, Dhaka University, University of Malaysia amongst many others).

Her work leading Restless Beings with Mabrur Ahmed and support for the persecuted Rohingya community in Burma as well as women's rights in Kyrgyzstan received particular praise and attention of the international media and world opinion.

In May 2014, Begum was interviewed by Nadia Ali on BBC Asian Network about the Rohingya migrant crisis.

Personal life
On 27 August 2013, Begum married Restless Beings co-founder Mabrur Ahmed.

See also
British Bangladeshi
List of British Bangladeshis

References

External
 

1984 births
Living people
English Muslims
English human rights activists
Women human rights activists
British charity and campaign group workers
English humanitarians
English people of Bengali descent
People educated at Plashet School
People educated at Seven Kings High School
Alumni of University College London
20th-century Bengalis
21st-century Bengalis